Kolos is both a surname and a given name. Notable people with the name include:

 Serhiy Kolos, Ukrainian Paralympic athlete
 Włodzimierz Kołos (1928–1996), Polish chemist and physicist
 Kolos Ferenc Vaszary (1832–1915), Hungarian Roman Catholic cardinal